Charlotte Brontë's novel Jane Eyre (1847) has been the subject of numerous television and film adaptations. This 1973 four-hour literary version was originally broadcast as a five-part BBC television drama serial. It was directed by Joan Craft and starred Sorcha Cusack and Michael Jayston.

Plot
In this version of Charlotte Brontë's novel, Jane Eyre (Sorcha Cusack) is an independent and strong-minded young woman who is hired by Mr. Rochester (Michael Jayston) to work as a governess. What she does not realize is that she must share the estate (and ultimately Mr. Rochester) with his wife, Bertha (Brenda Kempner), who is, by this point in her life, mentally ill and kept locked away in an upstairs attic.

For a full-length summary see: Jane Eyre plot summary.

Cast

Reception
Henry Mitchell in a 21 July 1982 review for The Washington Post noted of the mini-series that "At its best, it sounds like Jane Austen through a glass darkly and that is very good indeed." Richard Shepard's 21 July 1982 review for The New York Times was mixed, noting (of its highly literary style) that the production "is impeccably done, to judge from the first part, and appears to be faithful to the book, but perhaps because of this faithfulness it does not catch fire. It is an enactment from the book, and one must judge for oneself whether to honor or deprecate it for its literary fidelity." Shepard offers high praise of the cast, stating that, "as its heroine, Sorcha Cusack makes an uncommonly strong, yet reserved, Jane. She is not pretty but has a quiet beauty enhanced by a slight smile and an expression that is attractively quizzical. Her soft voice supplies bridging text from the book between scenes. Michael Jayston is craggily handsome and strong and more theatrical in his portrayal of Rochester, the imperious, troubled master whose service she enters and whose heart she captures."

DVD 
The DVD for this series is available, distributed by Acorn Media UK.

References

External links
BBC:A History of Jane Eyre on Screen
Review at JaneEyre.net
 Jane Eyre Multimedia Presentation 
 

BBC television dramas
Television shows based on British novels
Films based on Jane Eyre
1973 drama films